Senator Love may refer to:

Garrett Love (born 1988), Kansas State Senate
James M. Love (1820–1891), Iowa State Senate
John Love (congressman) (died 1822), Virginia State Senate
Peter Early Love (1818–1866), Georgia State Senate
Robert Love (soldier) (1760–1845), North Carolina State Senate
Shirley Love (politician) (born 1933), West Virginia State Senate
William F. Love (1850–1898), Mississippi State Senate
William L. Love (1872–after 1951), New York State Senate